"Blame It on You" is a song written by Michael Tyler, Brian Gene White, John Edwards, Kurt Allison and Tully Kennedy, and recorded by American country music singer Jason Aldean. It was released on October 26, 2020 as the third single from his ninth studio album 9.

Music video
The music video was released on January 28, 2021, and directed by Shaun Silva. It told a story about a young couple rise and fall relationship in the 1940s.

Chart performance
The song reached No. 5 on the Hot Country Songs chart and No. 1 on Country Airplay, becoming Aldean's 23rd No. 1 on the latter format.

Live performance
On May 3, 2021, Aldean performed the song on Jimmy Kimmel Live!.

Charts

Weekly charts

Year-end charts

References

2020 songs
2020 singles
Jason Aldean songs
Song recordings produced by Michael Knox (record producer)
BBR Music Group singles
Country ballads